Mary Coffin Ware Dennett (April 4, 1872 – July 25, 1947) was an American women's rights activist, pacifist, homeopathic advocate, and pioneer in the areas of birth control, sex education, and women's suffrage. She co-founded the National Birth Control League in 1915 together with Jessie Ashley and Clara Gruening Stillman. She founded the Voluntary Parenthood League, served in the National American Women's Suffrage Association, co-founded the Twilight Sleep Association, and wrote a famous pamphlet on sex education and birth control. A famous legal case against her eventually became the catalyst for overturning the Comstock laws.

Biography

Early life
Mary Coffin Ware Dennett was born April 4, 1872 in her hometown Worcester, Massachusetts.  Dennett was the second child of four born to George and Vonie Ware. Dennett was a precocious, talkative, and assertive child, "scolding [her older brother] for striking her, often quoting the Bible."  At age 10, her father died of cancer. Her mother supported the family by organizing European tours for young women. While her mother was absent on tours, Dennett and her siblings often lived with their Aunt Lucia Ames Mead, a prominent social reformer.  Dennett enrolled in the School of Art and Design in the Boston Museum of Fine Arts in 1891 and graduated with first honors, then took a teaching position at the Drexel Institute of Art in Philadelphia in 1894.  She also had a position at Drexel Institute teaching design and decoration from 1894-1897.

Marriage and children
Dennett married William Hartley Dennett, an architect, in 1900. They shared the ideal of the Arts and Crafts movement and soon bought a farmhouse in Framingham, Massachusetts. They founded an architectural and interior design firm. In addition to her work as an interior designer and guadamacile maker, Dennett continued to lecture and write about the Arts and Crafts movement.

The Dennetts’ first child a son named Carlton was born in December 1900, after a difficult labor that nearly killed the mother. After another difficult labor, their second child a son named Appleton was born in 1903. However the baby was frail and died 3 weeks later. A third child was born in 1905 another boy named Devon, again after a difficult labor. Following this labor Dennett became ill and had to give up her professional work in order to recover. This time the doctor told the Dennetts that they should not have any more children, due to a laceration in her uterus that required corrective surgery. However her doctor did not give them any information on birth control.  Later Dennett wrote of their lack of information on birth control:

Divorce and notoriety
In 1904, Dennett's husband William Hartley Dennett began work on a house for Dr. Heman Lincoln Chase and his wife Margaret. Hartley Dennett and Margaret Chase eventually developed an extremely close relationship, culminating in William Hartley Dennett moving out of his and Mary's house in 1909. Concerned about the effect that Hartley was having on their children, Dennett filed for divorce in 1912, at the time an unusual and scandalous action. The courts finalized Dennett's divorce and granted her full custody of her children in 1913. The divorce proceedings were a popular topic in the local newspapers, to Mary Dennett's great discomfort.

Career as women's rights advocate
Motivated by both a desire to escape the unpleasant realities of her life as well as William Hartley Dennett's refusal to financially support his children, Mary Dennett returned to working outside the home, but not in her previous career as an artist and interior designer. In 1908 she accepted the position of field secretary of the Massachusetts Women’s Suffrage Association, beginning a long career in public advocacy for women's rights.

Dennett worked for the cause of women's suffrage from 1910 to 1914, a period that marked the revival of the women's suffrage movement, which had stagnated during the previous decade. After several years of work for the National American Women's Suffrage Association, she became disillusioned with the organization and resigned from her position.

Dennett co-founded the Twilight Sleep Association (1913), which advocated the use of scopolamine and morphine to ease the pain of childbirth. Statistics showed that twilight sleep reduced infant mortality and the risk of injury and infection, due to reduced use of forceps. She served as acting president until 1914, then as vice president.

When the European war broke out in 1914, Dennett joined the Women's Peace Party, an anti-war movement. In 1916, she served as field secretary for the American Union against Militarism, organizing meetings in several large cities. Dennett's work to re-elect Woodrow Wilson (under the belief that he would not declare war) led to a respected job as executive secretary for the League for Progressive Democracy. She resigned after Wilson did enter the United States into the war in 1917. She next co-founded and was employed by the People's Council of America, a socialist peace movement inspired by the Bolsheviks.

In 1915, Dennett's name was again in the newspapers, against her wishes. Her ex-husband Hartley Dennett, his partner Margaret Chase, and her husband Dr. Chase extended a public invitation to Mary Dennett to, as one newspaper put it, "adopt the creed of harmonious love and form a quadrangle" with the three of them. Dennett feared the negative effect that her involuntary notoriety might have on the organizations she worked with and considered resigning from the Twilight Sleep Association.

In 1914, Dennett met Margaret Sanger, a birth control advocate. Dennett was intrigued, but did not feel financially secure enough to join the birth control movement at the time.  In 1915, Dennett wrote a sex education pamphlet for her children, as the result of the lack of any existing educational material that met her standards, which included scientific correctness, sex-positivity, and discussion of the emotional side of sexual relationships. The arrest of William Sanger in 1915 for distributing Margaret Sanger's birth control pamphlet catalyzed the birth control movement in the United States, and this time Dennett decided to get involved.

Dennett co-founded The National Birth Control League in 1915 with Jesse Ashley and Clara Gruening Stillman. In 1918, she became the NBCL's executive secretary and started a campaign to make birth control information legal, giving lectures and lobbying state legislatures to change the laws. During this time, her pamphlet on sex education, "The Sex Side of Life," was published. Later, as the NBCL faltered, she resigned as executive secretary and founded a new organization, the Voluntary Parenthood League, which focused on repealing anti-birth control information laws at the federal level. 

In 1929, Dennett was arrested for her work with sex education, women's rights, and birth control. Many people felt that her work was obscene and she should be imprisoned or fined. "Mary Dennett sounded defiant, proclaiming she would pay no fine, however small: 'If a few federal officials want to use their power to penalize me for my work for the young people of this country, they must bear the shame of a jail sentence. It is government which is disgraced, not I." Dennet was proud of her work in sexual education and wanted it to last.

Women's suffrage
Dennett did not become active in the women's suffrage movement until her marriage began to break up. Later, she wrote, "I went into suffrage work, as perhaps you know, because I needed an anesthetic at the time, and suffrage was the nearest thing at hand that was unconnected with my previous work." She began as field secretary of the Massachusetts Suffrage Association, organizing lectures, rallies, sermons, cheap meals, speaking tours to gather signatures for petitions, and similar outreach efforts. Dennett's opinion on why women deserved the vote was simple: "Our basic principles that 'governments derive their just powers from the consent of the governed' [...] undeniably imply the right of women to direct representation by the vote, since women are governed and women are people."

In 1910, Dennett's success in Massachusetts led the National American Woman Suffrage Association to aggressively recruit her for the position of Corresponding Secretary, reporting to Dr. Anna Howard Shaw. At the time, the NAWSA was ineffective and riven by factional conflict, which many blamed on Dr. Shaw's leadership. Taking the job required Mary to move from Boston to New York City, a hardship for her since she couldn't afford to move her children with her. Dennett successfully resolved much of the internal conflict in NAWSA within a few months, while supporting Dr. Shaw. Many prominent NAWSA members credited Dennett with reuniting the NAWSA membership and turning the organization around. In 1910, Washington State granted women the right to vote, the first state to do so in 14 years.

Later, Dennett became disillusioned with NAWSA after an unsuccessful attempt to reorganize to be more effective and what she saw as wasteful decisions overly influenced by wealthy donors. She resigned her position at NAWSA in 1914.

Birth control movement
Dennett became inspired to fight for birth control after she sustained a laceration on her uterus after surgery.  Because of the surgery, she was advised by her doctor to not have children, and the only way she could ensure that she wouldn't become pregnant was by practicing abstinence. After William Sanger's arrest for distributing birth control information inspired a resurgence in the American birth control movement, Dennett co-founded The National Birth Control League in 1915 with Jesse Ashley and Clara Gruening Stillman. Dennett decided to start by rallying public support to strike down laws restricting birth control information. Later, as the NBCL faltered, she resigned as executive secretary and founded a new organization, the Voluntary Parenthood League. She used lobbying and lectures to promote the cause.

Fight for "straight repeal" to allow birth control information
Beginning in 1919, Dennett focused on a "straight repeal" of the birth control provisions of the Comstock Act at the federal level, rather than state-by-state efforts. She lobbied Congress to simply remove the words "prevention of conception" from federal obscenity statutes. Dennett repeatedly lobbied individual senators in person for a year before she found one willing to sponsor the bill, Senator H. Heisler Ball, a former practicing physician.  However, he never introduced the bill.

In 1921, Dennett changed her approach and decided to work directly with the postmaster general, whose responsibility it was to enforce the laws banning distribution of birth control information through the mails (although in practice this was not enforced). Postmaster General William Hayes seemed sympathetic, but resigned before taking any action. His replacement, Dr. Hubert Work, was adamantly opposed to birth control information, earlier stating that his opinions on birth control could be summarized as "sterilize all boys and girls who are unfit to become parents, and then let nature take its course unhindered."

Dennett returned to lobbying Congress in 1922, pointing out that private opinion of members of congress must be in favor of birth control since the average number of children of a member of congress was 2.7. She continued to have difficulty finding sponsors for the bill, but succeeded in 1923 when Senator Albert B. Cummins introduced the straight repeal bill in the Senate. However, the bill made no further progress during that session, since Cummins was unable to succeed in getting the rest of the Senate to vote on it due to mass absenteeism when it came up for a vote.

In the next session of Congress, Representative William N. Vaile sponsored the bill in the House of Representatives. However, it was also stalled continually and never came to a vote. In addition, Margaret Sanger and her organization lobbied in favor of a version of the bill that would allow birth control information to doctors only, and lobbied against the "straight repeal" bill. In 1925, Dennett gave up on passing the "straight repeal" bill and retired from her position at the VPL.

Dennett achieved her goal in an entirely different manner in 1930, by winning an appeal of her conviction for distribution of birth control information under the Comstock Act.

Sex education pamphlet and trial under the Comstock Act
Mary Ware Dennett garnered public attention and media exposure for her sex education pamphlet, “The Sex Side of Life,” which she had written for the benefit of her sons in 1915, because she was unable to find any adequate books on the subject. Many existing sexual-education publications either contained inaccurate information or used fear and shame tactics to dissuade the youth from having sex. Therefore, she decided to write her own explanation using research and interviews with doctors. She passed the writing on to her friends with adolescent children. In 1918, it was published in Medical Review of Reviews, and a year later it was published as a pamphlet.

The pamphlet was 24 pages long. Dennett used scientific discussion of sex while also including the emotion side of sex relations. The pamphlet covered controversial topics including masturbation, sexually transmitted diseases, prostitution, and support for the use of birth control. Her views were considered radical for this time, because she was not promoting abstinence. 

After fours years of being in circulation, the Post Office informed Dennett that the pamphlet was obscene, and therefore it was banned from being mailed under the Comstock Act. She continued to mail out the pamphlet after the Post Office ignored her inquiries of what parts of the pamphlet were obscene.
	
In 1928, she was indicted under the Comstock laws for distributing her pamphlet. H. L. Mencken observed the proceedings. He had briefly praised Mrs. Dennett’s book  in the May 1926 issue of The American Mercury, and took a sympathetic interest in her later legal troubles:

Eventually a safe jury was empanelled by the prosecution “and Mrs. Dennett was quickly convicted, and Judge Burrows fined her $300. The jury was composed entirely of "middle-aged family men". The American Civil Liberties Union (ACLU) supported and sponsored Dennett, maintaining that her pamphlet was not obscene. In fact, it was an important educational tool for the youth. Six months later the Circuit Court of Appeals, consisting of [Thomas Walker?] Swan, Augustus Noble Hand and Chase, JJ, set aside the verdict, decided that the pamphlet was so obviously not obscene that ‘no case was made for submission to the jury,’ and ordered Mrs. Dennett released from her bond.” 

When the United States Court of Appeals for the Second Circuit overturned her conviction in 1930, the Court set a legal precedent that took intent into account in the evaluation of obscenity. Dennett's trial was part of a series of rulings that culminated in the 1936 ruling in United States v. One Package of Japanese Pessaries, which exempted birth control information and materials used by physicians from obscenity laws.

See also
 History of the birth control movement in the United States

Notes

References
1. ^Craig, John M. ""the Sex Side of Life": The Obscenity Case of Mary Ware Dennett." Frontiers: A Journal of Women Studies, vol. 15,no. 3, 1995, pp. 145-166.

2.  ^Levinson, Martin H. ""the Sex Side of Life": Mary Ware Dennett's Pioneering Battle for Birth Control and Sex Education." ETC.: A Review of General Semantics, vol. 54, 1997, pp. 257+.

3. ^ Rosen, R. L. Dennett, Mary Coffin Ware. American National Biography Online, Feb. 2000.

4. ^WEINRIB, LAURA M. "The Sex Side of Civil Liberties: United States v. Dennett and the Changing Face of Free Speech." Law and History Review, vol. 30, no. 2, 2012, pp. 325–386.

5

External links

 Papers, 1874-1945. Schlesinger Library, Radcliffe Institute, Harvard University.
 
 
 

1872 births
1947 deaths
American sex educators
American women's rights activists
People from Worcester, Massachusetts